State Route 315 (SR-315) is a short state highway in Box Elder County, Utah. It serves to connect U.S. Highway 89 and Interstate 15/Interstate 84 to Willard Bay State Park.

Route description
SR-315 begins at the entrance to the parking lot at the north marina of Willard Bay State Park, within the boundaries of the state park. It proceeds north through the park, passing entrances to Eagle Beach and Cottonwood Campground. The route then comes to a diamond interchange at I-15/I-84, exit 357 on that highway. It then crosses the Union Pacific Railroad before veering slightly east.

History
When I-15 was built through the Willard area, several surface roads were constructed as well, including 750 North; the Utah Department of Transportation Region One director recommended 750 North be added to the state highway system. Discussions within UDOT concluded the route should be extended to the state park and designated as a park access road, therefore receiving a number higher than 280. On December 20, 1974, the Utah Transportation Commission approved a resolution to add 750 North and the road to the marina to the state system as SR-315.

Major intersections

References

315
Transportation in Box Elder County, Utah